Phnom Kmoch is a mountain peak in Pursat Province, Cambodia. It is 1,220 meters tall

Phnom Kmoch is a conspicuous mountain located in the western part of the Cardamon Range.

See also
 Cardamom Mountains

References

External links 
 Kmoch, Phnom, Cambodia - Geotagged Places of Interest
Protected areas in Cambodia

Mountains of Cambodia
Cardamom Mountains
Geography of Pursat province